Oxycilla malaca, the bent-lined tan, is a species of moth in the family Erebidae. It is found in North America, where it has been recorded from Georgia, Indiana, Kentucky, Mississippi, North Carolina, Ohio, Pennsylvania, South Carolina, Tennessee and Texas.

The wingspan is about 20 mm.

The MONA or Hodges number for Oxycilla malaca is 8407.

References

Further reading

 

Rivulinae
Moths described in 1873